= Henry Ametepey =

Ghanaian politician

Hon. Henry Ametepey
- President: John Dramani Mahama

Personal details
- Born: Ghana
- Party: NDC

Henry Ametepey is a Ghanaian politician and a former deputy Volta Regional Minister of Ghana. He was appointed by President John Evan Atta Mills and sworn in during February 2012, and served till January 2013.

Political offices
Preceded by Cyril Neku	Volta Deputy Regional Minister; 2012-13	Succeeded by Francis Kolma Panyaglo
