= Francis Kolma Ganyaglo =

Ghanaian politician

Hon. Francis Komla Ganyaglo
- President: John Dramani Mahama

Personal details
- Born: Ghana
- Party: NDC

Francis Komla Ganyaglo (born May 11, 1971) is a Ghanaian politician and the deputy Volta Regional Minister of Ghana.

Political offices
Preceded by Henry Ametepey	Volta Deputy Regional Minister; 2013	Incumbent
